Zain Mahmood (1933 – 31 January 1994) was a Malaysian author and screenwriter of Malay films.  He wrote the musical drama Fenomena (1990),  the romantic drama Balada (Love Ballad) (1993) and the horror film Fantasi (1994).  Fantasi was shot in 1991 but banned for containing 'un-Islamic elements' until 1994. Its plot revolves around reincarnation, a Hindu and Buddhist concept which Islamists wish to suppress.  He also acted in Fantasi and produced Fenomena. He died, in his sleep, in January 31, 1994 aged 61.

References

External links
 
 Malaysian Cinema, Asian Film: Border Crossings and National Cultures

1933 births
1994 deaths
Malaysian people of Malay descent
Malaysian screenwriters
20th-century screenwriters